Swanberg is a surname. Notable people with the surname include:

Joe Swanberg (born 1981), American film director, producer, writer, and actor
Kris Swanberg (born 1980), American businesswoman, filmmaker, and actress
W. A. Swanberg (1907–1992), American biographer

See also
Swanberg Air, airline